A Night on the Danube is 1935 German comedy film directed by Carl Boese and starring Olga Engl, Wolfgang Liebeneiner, and Gustav Waldau.  It was shot at the EFA Studios in Berlin and on location in Budapest and Vienna. The film's sets were designed by the art directors Emil Hasler and Arthur Schwarz.

Cast

References

Bibliography 
 
 Klaus, Ulrich J. Deutsche Tonfilme: Jahrgang 1935. Klaus-Archiv, 1988.

External links 
 

1935 films
Films of Nazi Germany
German romantic comedy films
1935 romantic comedy films
1930s German-language films
Films directed by Carl Boese
Films set in Hungary
German black-and-white films
1930s German films
Films shot at Halensee Studios